Great Britain competed at the 2020 Winter Youth Olympics in Lausanne, Switzerland from 9 to 22 January 2020.

Medalists

Medalists in mixed NOCs events

Alpine skiing

Boys

Girls

Biathlon

 Shawna Pendry

Bobsleigh

Cross-country skiing

Boys
 James Slimon
 Girls
 Molly Jefferies

Curling

Mixed team

Summary

Mixed doubles
Summary

Freestyle skiing

 Scott Johns
 Jasper Klein
 Kirsty Muir

Ice hockey

 Mirren Foy
 Carter Hamill
 Evan Nauth
 Amy Robery
 Abby Rowbotham
 Mackenzie Stewart
 Jessie Taylor

Nordic combined

Individual

Short track speed skating

Boys

Girls

Ski jumping

 Sam Bolton

Speed skating

Boys

See also
Great Britain at the 2020 Summer Olympics

References

2020 in British sport
Nations at the 2020 Winter Youth Olympics
Great Britain at the Youth Olympics